The Playa de Colcura is a beach in the vicinity of the commune of Lota in the province of Concepcion, in the Biobío Region of Chile.

External links
  YouTube: Playa De Colcura (lota)
  Tageo.com: Map of the Caleta Colcura, showing the Bahia de Colcura and the Playa Colcura

Beaches of Chile
Landforms of Biobío Region
Coasts of Biobío Region